The 1891–92 Irish Cup was the twelfth edition of the premier knock-out cup competition in Irish football. 

Linfield won the tournament for the second time and second year in a row, defeating Black Watch (a British Army team) 7–0 in the final.

Results
YMCA, Linfield, Glentoran, Ulster, Cliftonville, Oldpark, Milltown, Lancashire Fusiliers, Ligoniel, Distillery, St Columb's Court, and Limavady all given byes into the third round.

First round

|}

Replays

|}

Second round

|}

Third round

|}

Replay

|}

Fourth round

|}

Fifth round

|}

Semi-finals

|}

Final

References

External links
 Northern Ireland Cup Finals. Rec.Sport.Soccer Statistics Foundation (RSSSF)

Irish Cup seasons
1891–92 domestic association football cups
1891–92 in Irish association football